Evidence for early glassmaking in the United States has been found of glassmaking at the English settlement on Jamestown Island, Virginia. While some glass window panes were made there after 1608, most of the windows had been shipped from England.

The glassmaking business in the United States started when eight Germans (known as "Dutchmen") and Poles arrived as part of the Second supply on board the Mary and Margaret. They used local material: sand in the James River, potash was in the forest and a bed of endless oyster shells which could be burned and ground to make lime. They set up making the first batches of goods exported to England from the New World. The first shipment sent to England was called the trial glass. Most of it was window glass, bottles, vials and plain drinking glasses. The glass factory at Jamestown was believed to be the first manufactory in the United States.

The Glass House Point 

The location was near the Jamestown peninsula over a mile from the fort, in a location that was convenient for glassblowing. The Jamestown Glasshouse was situated where the Native Americans used to camp and where the main roads converged, known to the settlers as the Greate Road.  The area came to be called Glass House Point. Though this location made the recovery of mineral resources easily accessible, it also made the glassmakers vulnerable to sneak attacks by local tribes. The glass manufactory was controlled exclusively by the Polish glassmakers. The Dutchmen went to Werowocomoco (a Native American village on the York River fifteen miles from Jamestown) in order to build a house for the chief of the Powhatans, and plotted to kill Captain John Smith and steal powders and arms from the settlers. They didn’t succeed, and were kicked out of the village when the chief became suspicious of their dealings.

Production 

The glassmaking operation required three furnaces with different sizes. The first furnace was for melting the glass, the smaller one for annealing or cooling the finished glass. And an even smaller fritting furnace for preheating the ingredients needed for making the glass. A fourth furnace was erected to fire up the clay pots used in the glassmaking process. The construction of the furnaces was made up of huge boulders rolled out of the river and glued together with mud. A rectangular wood-frame building was constructed to protect the furnaces and the workers from the weather. Overall the glass house was about thirty seven feet wide by fifty feet long, and probably had a high thatched roof and partially open sides with the office situated next to the furnaces.

Archaeological evidence 

In 1948, while excavating the foundation of the furnaces, archaeologist Jean Carl Harrington theorized that the workmen probably produced a lot of green glass. The glass was comparable to that produced in England: exhibit showcases, window panes, bottles, and drinking vessels. Glassmaking in the colonies was discontinued in 1609 during the Starving Time. The Virginia Company expected returns; since the glassmaking business was in decline, they ventured to other manufactories.

American production 

Glassmaking in America symbolized wealth. Ivor Noël Hume excavated in Virginia and found one fragment of a piece of glass. Most glass was utilitarian with a case of glasses in the parlor quite common. Over 70 percent of Hume’s finds were fragments of quatre foil-stemmed glasses. Round bottles assumed a more squat shape. Glass was not universal in most households. Many wealthy colonists had little to no glass in their households. According to his records, a Ralph Fisbourn died in Chester, Pennsylvania in 1708 with an estate of £1,762; his only glass possessions were a few bottles.

American glass factories were founded first in New York in 1732 and then in South Jersey by Caspar Wistar in 1739. The 1730s saw an increasing variety of products. Boston merchants advertised wine glasses, jelly glasses, syllabubs, decanters, sugar pots, barrel cans, punch bowls, bird fountains, and candlesticks. Merchants also offered japanned glassware. "For those who did buy taste in the newest styles, drinking glasses were the inverted baluster type (popular in England from 1720 to about 1735) or the later drawn stem glass (1730–1745)." Both types have been found in Virginia. Wealth and fashion did not dictate an elaborate collection of glass, for the Reverend Ebenezer Thayer who died in nearby Roxbury less than a year later had £137 worth of silver. But his only glass was some salts in the parlor.

Style 

The style of glassmaking changed by 1746 when the government passed the Glass Excise Bill, which taxed glass by weight; beginning in 1751 advertisements in a Boston newspaper made a reference to “new fashion” glass. Usually the phrase referred to the air twist stemmed glass or “wormed wine glasses” that had first been advertised in the Boston market in 1746. By 1761, glasses and decanters were also engraved or “flowered”. Glassmakers worked diligently to provide special glasses for specific purposes, and inevitably only the well-to-do could afford a full array of forms. The inventory of Governor Francis Fauquier’s glass is revealing, when the former Governor of Virginia died in 1768, he left: 5 beer glasses, 5 champagne glasses, 14 water glasses, 55 wine glasses, 59 syllabub glasses, 69 jelly glasses, 23 glass salvers, 15 decanters and 8 cruets. He also had three sets of salvers that made up into large pyramids; the largest pyramid was valued at £15. Such pyramids were advertised in the Boston press in 1772.
During the Federal Period, after the American Revolutionary War, Americans adopted new European styles. During the Revolutionary period, decoration was minimal. Although the American glass industry was making a strong beginning, considerable quantities were still imported. Cut glass, made in England since the 1720s, was advertised in Baltimore as early as 1786, gaining popularity toward the end of the period, though imports from Britain still dominated the American market.  American production of blown three-mold glass began during the War of 1812. Glassmakers Henry William Stiegel and John Frederick Amelung had both tried to produce elaborate, fine table glass rivaling the European imports and both failed because there was not yet a market for the work they produced.

European influences 

Many of the glassmakers who worked in American factories were from England and their designs bore a resemblance to that of European designs. European cut glass influenced the patterns of American cut glass until 1880. Phillip McDonald designed the “Russian” pattern for T.G. Hawkes & Company of Corning, New York; from this point on American cut glass wares became richer in design and quality of both workmanship and glass. John S. O’Connor’s “Parisian” patterns - the first cut glass designs to utilize a curved line in cutting - greatly influenced American designs thereafter, because most of the cutting had been straight lines.

Manufactures across the mid colonies 

Since the Anglo-American War of 1812 had stopped the importation of fine cut glass from abroad, American factories progressed in the making of flint glass. Glassworks such as the South Boston Crown Glass Company manufactured flint glass in South Boston. Another flint glass manufacturer, the New England Glass Company, was established in 1818. Glassmakers often worked for a number of companies; many split off to form their own glassworks. The glassmaking business could be risky; many glassworks closed after only a few years in business due to labor or financial troubles.

The Bay State Glass Company was established in East Cambridge, Massachusetts in 1857, and advertised products such as cut flint glassware and engraved glass. However, the firm dissolved only a few years later in 1863. The Boston and Sandwich Glass Company in Sandwich, Massachusetts produced a considerable quantity of fine cut glassware after 1826, but closed in 1888 due to troubles with a newly formed glassmakers' union. In Meriden, Connecticut, Parker and Casper opened a glass cutting shop in 1867. They manufactured decanters, caster bottles, and sugar, salt and mustard glass liners until the shop closed in 1869.

References
 

History of glass